Jean-Baptiste Kerebel (2 April 1918, in Paris – 9 March 2010) was a French track and field athlete who mainly competed in the 400 metres.

He competed for France at the 1948 Summer Olympics held in London, Great Britain, where he won the silver medal in the men's 4 x 400 metre relay with his teammates François Schewetta, Robert Chef d’Hotel and Jacques Lunis.

References
Jean Kerebel's profile at Sports Reference.com
Jean Kerebel's obituary 

1918 births
2010 deaths
Athletes from Paris
French male sprinters
Olympic silver medalists for France
Athletes (track and field) at the 1948 Summer Olympics
Olympic athletes of France
French people of Breton descent
Medalists at the 1948 Summer Olympics
Olympic silver medalists in athletics (track and field)
20th-century French people
21st-century French people